The Pentecostal Church of Visby is a church belonging to the Swedish Pentecostal Movement in Visby on the Swedish island of Gotland. It has been in use since 1988.

References

Churches in Gotland County
Pentecostal churches in Sweden